Ibadan North is a Local Government Area in Oyo State, Nigeria. Its headquarters stood at Agodi in Ibadan. The postal code of the area is 200.

Demographics
It has an area of 27 km and a population of 856,988 according to the Oyo State Government in 2017.

It also has bustling academic and economy activities with the presence of the First Premier University in Nigeria, the University of Ibadan, founded in 1948, and The Polytechnic, Ibadan in 1970 creates an aura of lively place to live in.

References

Local Government Areas in Oyo State
Local Government Areas in Yorubaland